Ralfi Pagán (born Rafael Pagán; 1946–1978) was a Bronx, New York-based Latin soul and salsa singer of Puerto Rican and Cuban parentage who was active from the mid-1960s until his death in 1978. He specialized in soul ballads sung both in Spanish and English and released five albums during the 1970s. He is well known for the duet with Sylvia Robinson entitled Soul Je T'aime and for his solo reworking of Make It With You previously recorded by David Gates and Bread. Ralfi toured with legendary music producer and promoter Eddie Torres for several years throughout the Southwest United States. Prior to leaving on tour Ralfi visited Eddie’s home to share he was leaving to Colombia. Eddie told Ralfi he had a bad feeling about the trip. Eddie advised Ralfi not to go. Ralfi went to Colombia against Torres’ advise. In 1978, he was murdered while on a promotional tour in Colombia, South America. His murder remains unsolved.

Early career
The first recording released by Pagán was an all-but-unnoticed 45RPM single recorded in New York and released in 1966 on the RCA Victor label under the name Ray Paige. Subsequently, as a backing vocalist Pagán featured on a number of recordings by King Nando's Orchestra (real name Fernando Rivera) before in 1969, Pagán released the self-titled album, Ralfi Pagan, on Fania Records produced by Kenny Vance. Issued twice, first with all Spanish sung titles and shortly after with four English song titles substituted for four Spanish titles Pagán's falsetto tenor favored ballads such as Who Is The Girl For Me, Don't Stop Now, and I Can't See Me Without You. This made him highly popular amongst young Hispanic Americans particularly in the urban centres of Los Angeles and New York where Pagán made a significant cultural impact. He was also adept on up-tempo salsa such as his cover of Oscar Brown's Brother, Where Are You?

In 1971 he broke through nationally with a Latin cover of Make It With You which entered the Billboard R&B chart on the 10 July 1971 for an eleven-week run during which it peaked at #32. It sold 250,000 copies nationally and Pagán appeared on the nationally syndicated TV show Soul Train, making him one of the first Latino artists to ever appear on the program.

A second album With Love produced by Harvey Averne and Jerry Masucci and recorded in New York consolidated Pagán's status amongst urban Hispanics and Chicanos. A further R&B hit in 1973 with Soul Je T'Aime, a duet with Sylvia Robinson on Vibration records was his last appearance on the national charts. The Ralfi album containing Latin soul and salsa-influenced tracks was released the same year.

In 1975 he released his fourth and final Fania album I Can See which included his distinctive take on Smokey Robinson & the Miracles track Ooh Baby Baby and the bittersweet Stay Out of My Life.

Chicano favorite
By 1976 Pagán was based in Los Angeles where he connected with Colombian band leader drummer percussionist Mike Rojas. He found particular favour among young Chicanos for whom his persona as a sensitive Latin lover resonated. In Los Angeles he recorded his last album El Flaco De Oro with Mike Rojas who features with a timbal solo on the song entitled "Cubita Triste". Ralfi became a regular on the thriving club and salsa dance circuit that included The Gold Dust on Garfield Avenue in Montebello, The King's Table in Pico Rivera, The Monterey West in East Los Angeles and the Mardi Gras across from MacArthur Park.

Pagán maintained a parallel career as a salsa singer and as a latin style disco singer. He released Girl From The Mountain on Coco records in 1976, a record aimed primarily at the disco market. The album El Flaco De Oro, (sung entirely in Spanish), however, represented him as a salsa singer. This release appeared on Pumpkris Records, for whom he also handled production duties on an album by Johnny Nelson entitled Ralfi Pagan Presenta Johnny Nelson - El Principe de La Salsa. Pagán's final known release is the disco sounding "Take Me With You" b/w "Heaven Sent You" also on Pumpkris. An album Take Me With You was scheduled, but Pagán's early death curtailed its release.

Death in Colombia
Pagán had a large following in Latin America and regularly appeared in South America. Substituting for fellow Fania Records performer Joe Bataan whilst on tour in Colombia in 1978, Pagán was murdered. His family was told that a promoter arranged for his murder to avoid payment of money due with his body being left on a local beach.

Most of Pagán's back catalogue has been made available since the mid-1990s, and he is now probably better known to the general music-listening public than he was during his lifetime. A Fania track from 1973, "The Gambler", was featured in the Leon Ichaso film Pinero (2001) starring Benjamin Bratt as the poet-playwright-actor Miguel Pinero.

Discography

Albums
1971: Ralfi Pagan
1972: With Love 
1973: Ralfi 
1975: I Can See
1978: El Flaco de Oro
1978: Take Me With You (unreleased)

Selected Singles
1966: Don't Stop Now / Ain't No Soul (Left In These Shoes)
1969: Who Is The Girl For Me
1970: Don't Stop Now
1971: Make It With You / Stray Woman (US #104; US R&B #32)
1971: Mi Camacho / Negrona
1971: Baby I'm-A Want You / Look At Her
1971: I Can't See Me Without You
1972: Up On The Roof / The Gambler
1973: Soul Je T'Aime (with Sylvia)
1974: Wonderful Thing / To Say I Love You
1975: Just For A Little While
1975: La Vida
1976: Girl From The Mountain
1978: Take Me With You / Heaven Sent You

References

1947 births
1978 deaths
People from the Bronx
Record producers from New York (state)
American people of Puerto Rican descent
Fania Records artists
Salsa musicians
20th-century American singers
20th-century American businesspeople
20th-century American male singers